The Kiri Te Kanawa Foundation is a charitable foundation set up by the celebrated opera soprano Kiri Te Kanawa to help music students.

Vision
The vision of the Kiri Te Kanawa Foundation is that talented young New Zealand singers and musicians with complete dedication to their art may receive judicious and thoughtful mentoring and support to assist them in realising their dreams.

The Foundation's mission is to establish, build and manage a trust fund to provide financial and career support to such talented New Zealanders. The first person to be awarded a grant under the trust was the young Dunedin born soprano Ana James.

External links
Official website

Educational foundations
Arts foundations based in Oceania
Charities based in New Zealand
Music education organizations
Music organisations based in New Zealand